The 1916 Georgetown Blue and Gray football team represented Georgetown University during the 1916 college football season. Led by Albert Exendine in his third year as head coach, the team went 9–1. Georgetown's 464 points was the most among major programs, and Johnny Gilroy led individual scorers with 160 points. The season's highlight was the defeat of Dartmouth.

Schedule

References

Georgetown
Georgetown Hoyas football seasons
Georgetown Blue and Gray football